Gavin John Bishop  (born 1946) is an author and illustrator, from Invercargill, New Zealand. He is known for illustrating books from prominent New Zealand authors, including Joy Cowley and Margaret Mahy. Bishop's first published picture book was Mrs McGinty and the Bizarre Plant, published in 1981 by Oxford University Press.

Early life

Bishop was born in Invercargill.

Career

Bishop worked as a high school art teacher for thirty years, before writing and illustrating children's books full-time.

In 2006, he accused the makers of the Hollywood film Mr and Mrs Smith of plagiarizing his 1997 school book The Secret Lives of Mr and Mrs Smith.

Select honours and awards
2018 – Margaret Mahy Book of the Year Award for Aotearoa: The New Zealand Story at the New Zealand Children's Book Awards
2013 – Officer of the New Zealand Order of Merit, for services to Children's Literature.
2013 – Mallinson Rendel Illustrators Award
2013, 2000, 1994, 1983 – New Zealand Post Children's Book Awards, winner of the picture book category.
2010, 2008, 2006, 1982 – LIANZA Russell Clark Medal for Illustration.
2000 – Margaret Mahy Medal for Services to Children's Literature.
1984 – Noma Concours for Picture Book Illustrations, Grand Prize.

Select bibliography
2020 – Mihi, 18pp, (Gecko Press) 
2018 – Cook's Cook Limited Edition, 40pp, (Gecko Press)  
2018 – Cook's Cook, 40pp, (Gecko Press)  
2017 – Aotearoa: The New Zealand Story (Penguin)
2017 – Helper and Helper, 128pp, (Gecko Press)  
2013 – Mister Whistler, 32pp, (Gecko Press) 
2012 – Koinei te Whare nā Haki i Hanga, 40pp, Māori translation of The House that Jack Built (Gecko Press) 
2012 – The House that Jack Built, 40pp, (Gecko Press) 
2010 – Counting the Stars: Four Maori Myths
2010 – Friends: Snake & Lizard, Joy Cowley, Gecko Press (illustrator)
2010 – Cowshed Christmas (illustrator)
2010 – There Was a Crooked Man
2009 – Piano Rock: A 1950s Childhood
2008 – Rats!
2008 – Snake & Lizard, Gecko Press (illustrator)
2007 – Riding the Waves: four Maori Myths
2006 – Te Waka
2006 – Kiwi Moon
2005 – Taming the Sun: Four Maori Myths
2004 – The Three Billy Goats Gruff
2002 – Tom Thumb
1982 – Mr. Fox, 32pp, (Oxford University Press)

See also

 New Zealand literature

References

External links
Author website
Gavin Bishop on Gecko Press's website

1946 births
Living people
Officers of the New Zealand Order of Merit
New Zealand illustrators
New Zealand children's writers
New Zealand children's book illustrators